Ferdinand Julien (born 30 June 1946) is a former French racing cyclist. He rode in eight editions of the Tour de France between 1973 and 1980.

References

External links

1946 births
Living people
French male cyclists